Piacenza Calcio were relegated in the second season in the top echelon of Italian football. Coach Andrea Agostinelli was soon sacked, but Luigi Cagni could not save Piacenza from going down.

Squad

Goalkeepers
  Matteo Guardalben
  Paolo Orlandoni
  Maurizio Franzone

Defenders
  Matteo Abbate
  Nicola Boselli
  Hugo Campagnaro
  Giuseppe Cardone
  Filippo Cristante
  Sergei Gurenko
  Gianluca Lamacchi
  Amedeo Mangone
  Alessandro Rinaldi
  Vittorio Tosto
  Paolo Tramezzani

Midfielders
  Davide Baiocco
  Sandro Cois
  Eusebio Di Francesco
  Claudio Ferrarese
  Marco Marchionni
  Dario Marcolin
  Enzo Maresca
  Salvatore Miceli
  Bogdan Pătraşcu
  Luigi Riccio
  Marco Stella

Attackers
  Ibrahim Babatunde 
  Nicola Caccia
  Ciro De Cesare
  Dario Hübner
  Johnnier Montaño
  Iván Obolo
  Francesco Zerbini

Serie A

Matches
Kick-off times are CET

Manager: Andrea Agostinelli

Manager: Luigi Cagni

Top Scorers
  Dario Hübner 14 (1)
  Enzo Maresca 9 (1)
  Eusebio Di Francesco 6
  Ciro De Cesare 3

Sources
  RSSSF - Italy 2002/03

Piacenza Calcio 1919 seasons
Piacenza